Andrew Norriss (born 1947) is a British children's author and a writer for television.

Background 
Andrew Norriss was born in 1947. He was educated at St John's School, Leatherhead followed by University at Trinity College Dublin (1966–70). After teaching at Stroud School, Romsey he trained for his PGCE at University of Winchester from 1973 to 1974, then taught History at Peter Symonds College, Winchester from 1974 to 1985. Whilst teaching he started writing television sitcoms and children's comedy dramas with Richard Fegen. He now lives in Hampshire with his wife, and writes children's books.

Writing 
Norriss won The Whitbread (Costa) Children's Book Award (1997) for his children's book Aquila, which he wrote both as a book and as the Aquila series for the BBC. He also adapted his book Matt's Million for ITV and novelized the second to fourth series of his TV show Woof! (itself based on a book by Allan Ahlberg), the first three series of Bernard's Watch and the second series of Aquila, as well as creating and co-writing the successful sitcom The Brittas Empire.

Norriss has retired from giving talks in schools and libraries around the country for children and teachers, but is still writing. His 2015 book Jessica's Ghost is published by David Fickling Books and was shortlisted for the Costa Children's Book Award in 2016.

Children's books
Woof! The Tale Wags On (1989)
Woof! The Tales Gets Longer (1991)
Woof! A Twist in the Tale (1992)
Matt's Million (1995)
Aquila (1997)
Bernard's Watch (1999)
The Touchstone (2004)
The Unluckiest Boy in the World (2006)
The Portal (2007)
Ctrl-Z (2009)
Aquila 2 (2010)
I Don't Believe It, Archie! (2011)
Archie's Unbelievably Freaky Week (2012)
Jessica's Ghost (published in the United States as Friends for Life) (2015)
Mike (2018)
Felix Unlimited (2021)

Mainstream television
The Brittas Empire – BBC
The Labours of Erica – Thames/ITV
Ffizz – Thames/ITV
Chance in a Million – Thames/Channel 4

Children's television
Bernard's Watch – Carlton/ITV
Aquila – BBC
Matt's Million – Carlton/ITV
Woof! – Central/ITV;  based on the book by Allan Ahlberg

References

External links

 Andrew Norriss' homepage
 Information about Andrew Norriss' work
 Bibliography

Living people
British male screenwriters
British children's writers
Alumni of the University of Winchester
Alumni of Trinity College Dublin
People educated at St John's School, Leatherhead
1947 births